This is a list of American foil fencers. (Only noted and contemporary American foil fencers are included):

Albert Axelrod
Cliff Bayer
Daniel Bukantz
Miles Chamley-Watson
Emily Cross
Gay Jacobsen D'Asaro
Jedediah Dupree
Nick Evangelista
Harold Goldsmith
Race Imboden
Nick Itkin
Dan Kellner
Lee Kiefer
Byron Krieger
David Littell
Nathaniel Lubell
Michael Marx
Alexander Massialas
Gregory Massialas
Helene Mayer
Michael Sean McClain
Gerek Meinhardt
Janice Romary
Erinn Smart
Mark Smith
Molly Sullivan
Hanna Thompson
Jonathan Tiomkin
Doris Willette
Felicia Zimmermann
Iris Zimmermann

See also
Fencing
Foil
List of American epee fencers
List of American sabre fencers
USFA
USFA Hall of Fame

Foil